Gampa Govardhan is an Indian politician and a legislator of Telangana Legislature. Born in Baswapoor village Bhiknoor mandal, Kamareddy district.

He belongs to Puragiri Kshatriya/Perika community. He won Kamareddy assembly constituency on Telugu Desam Party ticket in 1994, 2004, 2009 and Telangana Rashtra Samithi ticket in 2014 and 2019 opposite to Shabbir Ali.

References

People from Telangana
Living people
People from Nizamabad, Telangana
Telangana Rashtra Samithi politicians
Telangana MLAs 2014–2018
1964 births
Telangana MLAs 2018–2023